A term used in Shi'i terminology, "hujja" means "proof [implied:  proof of God]." It is usually used to refer to a single individual in any given human era who represents God's "proof" to humanity.  The hujja is a prophet or an Imam who possess a relationship with God that is greater than anyone else. The Imam who is the hujja of his time functions as the ultimate mediator between God and humanity, giving the Imam the greatest precedence for interpretation of the Qur'an. As the mediator between God and humanity, the Imam is the only one who can properly resolve conflicting interpretations of the Qur'an's words, giving the Imam ultimate authority over divine knowledge.  In Twelver shi'ism the title "hujja" is specifically applied to the Twelfth Imam who is currently in a period of hiding and is attributed with the tradition of using Shi'i hadith to guide the religious community. The word Imam and hujja do not necessarily refer to the same person because an Imam may not be hujja but may keep the title of Imam.

Proof of Hujja
The Imam that is hujja is hujja for several different logical proofs that are supported by Shi'i Qur'an interpretation and Shi'i hadith. The first proof of an Imam who is hujja is presented by the Imam's role as mediator between God and humanity. The divine appointment of the Imam, according to Shi'i belief, was passed down from the Prophet Muhammad to 'Ali and his sons al-Hasan and al-Husayn, who passed the divine knowledge onto their sons and so on. Therefore, it is only those who are members of the Prophet's family line that possess the divine knowledge from God and therefore are hujja.

The second proof an Imam is hujja is shown by the inner guidance the Imam provides for mankind "for he is a channel of divine grace which comes to him inwardly from the suprasensible realm". The Imam with his extensive knowledge of the different levels of human behavior and spiritual faith, is able to influence others thoughts and inner beings to help aid them in the refinement of their souls and inward journey. The Imam's divine guidance from God gives him the ability to lead and influence, which is why the Imam is hujja (proof of God).

The third proof an Imam is hujja is based on the Imam's immunity from the pollution of human sin. The Imam is such a divine spiritual figure he is free from committing human error or misinterpreting the Qur'an, which would otherwise lead to human error and sin. For a man who does commit sin is not fit to lead for he can spread sin and is therefore denied the rank of Imam and therefore cannot possess hujja. Only those who are free from error can be considered divinely touched and therefore are hujja and entitled to the Imamate.

The fourth proof that the Imam is hujja is deducted by reason. God's grace keeps his creatures towards obedience and keeps them away from disobedience. However, if God orders man to do something He knows man cannot do or will have difficulty doing, He would contradict His own aim. Therefore, God gives humanity hujja to help lead man toward God and His spiritual greatness. The hujja sent here is filled with spiritual guidance and helps direct man towards God, which is also what the Imam does, which is why the Imam is hujja.

The last justification of the hujja comes from the idea that without the hujja the world would not exist. "The world cannot exist even for a moment without the imam who is the hujja of God. If the imam were to be taken away from the earth even for an hour, the earth would swallow up its inhabitants just as the sea swallows its people". The idea that the Imam, who is hujja, is always present helps support the fact that God is always present to mankind and it supports the fact that it is only through the Imam that God can be known.

See also 
 Bab (Shia Islam)
Hujjah

References

Islamic terminology
Shia belief and doctrine